Saphenista contermina is a species of moth of the family Tortricidae. It is found in Ecuador in the provinces of Tungurahua and Morona-Santiago.

The wingspan is 13 mm for males and 15 mm for females. The ground colour of the forewings is whitish creamy, suffused with pale brownish ferruginous except for the costal and subterminal areas which are sprinkled and dotted black. The hindwings are creamy, tinged with ochreous in the apex area.

References

Moths described in 2002
Saphenista